Elections to Stevenage Council in Hertfordshire, England were held on 4 May 2000. One third of the council was up for election; the seats of the candidates who finished third in each ward in the all-out election of 1999. The Labour Party stayed in overall control of the council, which it had held continuously since its creation in 1973.

After the election, the composition of the council was:
Labour 33
Liberal Democrat 3
Conservative 3

Election result

Ward results

Bandley Hill

Bedwell

Chells

Longmeadow

Manor

Martins Wood

Old Town

Pin Green

Roebuck

St Nicholas

Shephall

Symonds Green

Woodfield

References

2000 Stevenage election result

2000
2000 English local elections
2000s in Hertfordshire